= Foter =

Royalty-free photo database

- Area served: Worldwide
- Founders: Andrzej Stawarz, Krzysztof Stawarz, Witold Stawarz
- Industry: Remodeling, Interior Design
- Website: foter.com
- Users: 2 Million+
- Launched: September 2006

Foter is one of the largest sources of information and inspiration to interior designings. It also provides a searchable database of 355 million free-to-use royalty-free collections of photos. The website was founded in 2006 by Stawarz Brothers.

== History ==
In 2006, Foter was established as a source of high-quality royalty-free photos and inspiration for journalists and graphic designers. It has a database of 335 million free stock images that can be downloaded by the users. The images are licensed under Creative Commons and free to use, but require attributions. The website offers tools to embed the images and WordPress plugin for integration on various platforms.

=== Database ===
Starting in 2012, interior design inspiration photos from thousands of interior designers (link to about) started to appear on the website. In 2020, the photo database consisted of 6 thousand ideabooks containing 1.5 million photos selected by professional interior design curators.
